Derek Phillips (born 9 April 1975) is an American-born Trinidadian retired footballer who played as a left-sided defender. He has been a member of the Trinidad and Tobago national team.

Early life
Phillips grew up in Richmond, Virginia where he played for FC Richmond youth club.  In 1993, he graduated from Atholton High School.  He had played for Atholton his freshman season, then transferred to a school in Richmond for his sophomore and junior seasons.  He returned to Atholton for his senior year.  He attended University of Maryland, Baltimore County, playing on the men's soccer team in 1994 and 1995.

Club career
Phillips played in Germany where he played for Eintracht Oberissingheim of the Oberliga.  In May 1999, Phillips began the season with the Maryland Mania of the USL A-League.  However, he also played on loan to the Cocoa Expos for several 1999 U.S. Open Cup games.  In 2001, he joined Derry City FC.  In July 2002, he went to SV Wehen Wiesbaden on a free transfer.  In January 2002, he moved to TuRU Düsseldorf.  In 2003, he played one game for the Virginia Beach Mariners of the USL A-League.  He played for the Chesapeake Dragons from 2003 until 2005.  He signed for Rovers in February 2005 and made 11 appearances.

International career
Phillips' father, Lincoln Phillips, was born in Saint James, Trinidad and Tobago. He has represented Trinidad and Tobago on five occasions, making his senior international debut away to South Korea in on 14 July 2004. He is the son of former international goalkeeper Lincoln Phillips.

References

External links
Derek Phillips - Soca Warriors
T&T Squad Line-ups since 2000

1975 births
Living people
Citizens of Trinidad and Tobago through descent
Trinidad and Tobago footballers
Association football defenders
Derry City F.C. players
Shamrock Rovers F.C. players
League of Ireland players
Trinidad and Tobago international footballers
Chesapeake Dragons players
Virginia Beach Mariners players
UMBC Retrievers men's soccer players
USL League Two players
Trinidad and Tobago expatriate footballers
Trinidad and Tobago expatriate sportspeople in Ireland
Expatriate association footballers in the Republic of Ireland
American soccer players
American expatriate soccer players
American expatriate sportspeople in Ireland
American expatriates in the Republic of Ireland
American sportspeople of Trinidad and Tobago descent